Multikino is the second largest multiplex chain in Poland. It was responsible for opening the nation's first multiplex, located in Poznań. It is owned by Vue International, and the brand name also applies to cinemas in Lithuania.

History
The company started its operation in 1995 as joint venture between ITI Cinema and British UCI. In 2003 ITI bought the UCI shares and owned the company until 2013.

As Multikino was the first company to run multiplex cinemas in Poland, the term multikino is often used as a description of multiplex cinema. The situation resembles the one with Sony's Walkman, when it is used as a description for portable CC player, despite it being a registered trademark.

In February 2008 it was announced that Multikino would merge with its second largest rival, Silver Screen. Once the transaction was complete, Multikino operated 19 cinemas with 174 screens in 13 Polish cities. There were also plans to enter the Ukrainian market, but due to global crisis it has never happened.

In August 2008, Multikino have installed digital projectors in each cinema. That allows viewing of 3D movies in Dolby 3D Digital Cinema.

In 2010, Multikino opened the first cinema network outside Polish borders in Riga - Latvia (August 2010) and in Vilnius - Lithuania (September 2010).

In May 2013, Vue Entertainment acquired Polish Multikino. The acquisition was completed in October 2013.

Locations 

 Szczecin - 9 screens
 Vilnius - Lithuania (OZAS Gallery) - 7 screens
 Warszawa (Ursynów) - 12 screens
 Warszawa (Złote Tarasy) - 8 screens
 Warszawa (Wola Park) - 6 screens
 Warszawa (Targówek) - 12 screens
 Włocławek - 6 screens
 Wrocław (Arkady) - 10 screens
 Wrocław (Pasaż Grunwaldzki) - 11 screens
 Zabrze - 13 screens
 Zgorzelec - 3 screens
 Tychy - 5 screens

References

External links

Cinema chains in Poland
Companies based in Warsaw
Entertainment companies established in 1998